Atiqah Hasiholan Alhady (born January 3, 1982) is an Indonesian-Arab actress and model.

Biography
Hasiholan was born on 3 January 1982 to Achmad Fahmy Alhady, an Arab-Indonesian businessman, and Ratna Sarumpaet, a Batak playwright. She has three elder siblings: Mohammad Iqbal Alhady, Fathom Saulina, and Ibrahim Alhady. As a child she wanted to be a lawyer.

Hasiholan attended Monash University in Melbourne, Australia, where she studied media and psychology. On her summer holiday, she acted in her mother's theatre troupe, Satu Merah Putih Panggung; her enjoyment of the activity convinced her to become an actress. She made her feature film debut in Nia Dinata's 2006 film Berbagi Suami (Love for Share). She then played in several further films, including Suster N (Nurse N; 2007), Cinta Setaman (Love Potpurri; 2008) – in which she played a prostitute – and Pintu Terlarang (Forbidden Door; 2009).

In 2009, Hasiholan starred in her mother's film Jamila dan Sang Presiden (Jamila and the President), in which she played a prostitute named Jamila who is convicted and eventually executed for killing a government minister. Initially Hasiholan viewed her character as a "regular slutty prostitute", but after thinking of the character more thoroughly and interviewing real-life sex workers, she considered Jamila a "victim of life". The film was submitted to the 82nd Academy Awards for Best Foreign Language Film, but not nominated.

After Jamila, Hasiholan starred in Ruma Maida (Maida's House), directed by Teddy Soeriaatmadja. In the film she played a young university student who studies history through a house in Jakarta; Hasiholan said the film "boosted [her] sense of nationalism". She played a prostitute for the third time 2010's Darah Garuda (Blood of the Garuda), a minor role. For the role she also handled a gun, which she described as "so damn heavy". That same year she played in the sex comedy Mafia Insyaf (Repentant Mafia).

Hasiholan appeared in 2011 as the main character's mother in The Mirror Never Lies, directed by Kamila Andini. The film, about a Bajau family in Wakatobi, was intended to raise awareness about marine conservation. In June 2011, the short film "Payung Merah" ("Red Umbrella"), in which Atiqah played a woman with a red umbrella and love issues, won Best Asian Short Film at the ScreenSingapore festival. Later in 2011 she appeared in Arisan! 2, a sequel to the 2003 film Arisan!.

Influences
In a 2011 interview with The Jakarta Post, Hasiholan said that her mother was her greatest influence.

Filmography
 Berbagi Suami (Love for Share; 2006)
 Suster N (Nurse N; 2007)
 Dicintai Jo (Loved By Jo; 2007)
 Cinta Setaman (Love Potpurri; 2008)
 Pintu Terlarang (Forbidden Door; 2009)
 Jamila dan Sang Presiden (Jamila and the President; 2009)
 Ruma Maida (Maida's House; 2009)eeee
 Mafia Insyaf (Repentant Mafia; 2010)
 Darah Garuda (Blood of the Garuda; 2010)
 The Mirror Never Lies (2011)
 Arisan! 2 (2011)
 Hello Goodbye (2012) 
 Java Heat (2013)
 The Disposal (2013) - short film 
 La Tahzan (2013) 
 2014 (2014)
 3 Nafas Likas (2014) 
 Cinta Selamanya (2015) 
 Wonderful Life (2016) 
 Mantan Manten (2019) 
 Pariban: Idola dari Tanah Jawa (2019) 
 Sembil9n (2019) - TV mini-series 
 Edge of the World (2021)
 Stealing Raden Saleh (2022)

Awards and nominations

References
Footnotes

Bibliography

External links

Living people
Indonesian people of Yemeni descent
People of Batak descent
21st-century Indonesian actresses
Indonesian female models
Monash University alumni
1982 births
Actresses from Jakarta